Deathrash Bound is the first full-length album released by the Japanese metal band Aion. Released in 1989, it is the band's only official release with Hisayoshi on vocals. "Deathrash Bound" is also the band's catchphrase, appearing on many of their albums, DVDs, and merchandise. The band even created their own record label entitled "Deatrash Bound".

Track listing
 "Pandemonium" - (03:39)
 "Captured in the Dreams" - (03:48)
 "Night of the Murder" - (03:19)
 "Cradle Song (For a Son of a Bitch)" - (02:17)
 "Jack" - (01:54)
 "H.A.R (Human Affective Revelation)" - (03:33)
 "Struggle to Breathe" - (04:33)
 "Peter" - (01:29)
 "Mistless of Evil" - (03:50)
 "Torment in Fire" - (03:00)

Personnel
Hisayoshi- vocals
Izumi - lead and rhythm guitars
Dean - bass guitar
S.A.B - drums

References

1989 debut albums
Aion (Japanese band) albums